Brian Smith (born January 8, 1989) is a former American football linebacker who played in the National Football League (NFL). He played college football at the University of Notre Dame and attended St. Thomas Aquinas High School in Overland Park, Kansas. He was a member of the Cleveland Browns, Tampa Bay Buccaneers and Buffalo Bills.

Early years
Smith played high school football for the St. Thomas Aquinas High School Saints. He recorded 126 tackles and nine sacks during senior season, earning all-metro honors from the Kansas City Star.

College career
Smith played from 2007 to 2010 for the Notre Dame Fighting Irish.

Professional career
Smith was signed by the Cleveland Browns on July 28, 2011. He was released by the Browns on September 3, 2011. He was signed to the Browns' practice squad on November 29, 2011. Smith was released by the Browns on May 8, 2012. He signed with the Tampa Bay Buccaneers on August 2, 2012. He was released by the Buccaneers on August 27, 2012. Smith was signed by the Buffalo Bills on December 31, 2012. He was released by the Bills on August 30, 2013.

References

External links
Just Sports Stats

Living people
1989 births
American football linebackers
African-American players of American football
Notre Dame Fighting Irish football players
Cleveland Browns players
Players of American football from Kansas
People from Shawnee, Kansas
21st-century African-American sportspeople
20th-century African-American people